Ernst Israel Bornstein (26 November 1922 – 14 August 1978) was a Polish-born Jewish holocaust survivor who practised as a dentist and doctor post-war in Munich, Germany. He is the author of 'Die Lange Nacht', which was first printed in Germany in 1967 and translated into English by his daughter Noemie Lopian in 2015 as 'The Long Night'. It is a personal recollection of his time in 7 different concentration camps and several death marches ending in 1945. The book has been endorsed by David Cameron, Lord Finkelstein and Rabbi Lord Jonathan Sacks and is one of the chosen books for Holocaust Memorial Day 2018.

Personal life

Ernst Israel Bornstein was born in Zawiercie, Poland in 1922. He was the oldest of four children. He was educated in Jewish schools and was a talented student who spoke German, Yiddish and Polish.

He married Renee Koenig, herself a Holocaust survivor, in 1964 and they had three children: Noemie, Muriel and Alain. In 1978 at the age of 55, Ernst died of a heart condition very likely acquired during his years of starvation and forced labour. Ernst’s wife Renee later moved to Manchester, England.

The Holocaust

Until the outbreak of the Second World War, Bornstein lived with his happy, close-knit family in the Polish town of Zawiercie. When the Germans invaded in 1939, the synagogue was locked, Jewish pupils were barred from schools and the Nazis began their sustained policy of cruelty and prejudice towards the Jewish community.

Ernst who was 17 years old at the time, was dragged away from his family and conscripted into forced labour in March 1941. He spent the next four years enduring physical and psychological torture, starvation and sickness, all of which he documents in his unflinching memoir 'Die Lange Nacht'.

At one point he describes breaking down after receiving a letter from his parents, passed on by a kind German soldier, telling him that their town had been ‘cleansed of Jews’ and that ‘like other transports before us we are probably going to the extermination camp at Auschwitz’.

During 1941 to 1945, Bornstein was incarcerated in seven concentration camps: Grünheide (now Sieroniowice), Markstädt, Fünfteichen (now Miłoszyce), Gross-Rosen, Flossenbürg, Leonberg and Mühldorf.

Death march and liberation

In 1945, he was forced on a death march through Germany to evade the advancing Red Army; a friend who walked with him, Yaacov Bloch, was shot dead by the SS when they arrived at the Gross-Rosen concentration camp.

The Nazis wanted to transfer the surviving prisoners, including Ernst, to the mountains of the Tyrol and exterminate them all.

Ernst was finally liberated in Bavaria by American soldiers on 30 April 1945. In the book, The Long Night, he writes "The Germans packed us into boxcars and transported us in the direction of Munich. While we were in transit the Americans mounted an offensive and captured the train tracks. We were free'. 'Everyone fled from the train, but the "SS murderers" drove the group back into the wagons and began killing indiscriminately."

His parents and two younger sisters were murdered at Auschwitz. Of an extended family numbering 72 at the start of the war, by its conclusion only six had survived including Ernst and his sister Regina.

Post War

Ernst went on to train first as a dentist and then as a doctor after gaining a university place in Munich. He established a successful medical practice and married a French Jewish lady, Renée, after meeting her through mutual friends when he was 42 and she was 30. They had three children: Muriel, Alain and Noemie.

He started collecting his memoirs after discovering that many of his patients knew nothing about the Holocaust only a generation after it happened, others thought it had been exaggerated and falsified.

In 1967, he published 'Die Lange Nacht' and initially publishers were reluctant to give it attention, preferring not to speak of Germany's dark history. Yet it was well received on publication, netting a review in the Times Literary Supplement, even though it was published only in German.

In 1978, at the age of 55, Ernst died suddenly of a heart condition.

The Bornsteins moved to England and settled in Manchester, where Noemie’s mother believed the Jewish community would offer the bereaved family somewhere to begin anew.

The Long Night

With the help of a professional translator, Bornstein's daughter Noemie has translated Die Lange Nacht (The Long Night) into English from its original German. The book was published in 2015.

The book includes a prefaced letter by David Cameron and has been endorsed by Lord Finkelstein, Rabbi Lord Jonathan Sacks, Jonathan Dimbleby and Dan Snow.

A new German edition is published in 2020 with a foreword by Charlotte Knobloch.

References

1922 births
1978 deaths
People from Zawiercie
People from Kielce Voivodeship (1919–1939)
Polish Jews
Polish emigrants to Germany
Gross-Rosen concentration camp survivors
Jewish concentration camp survivors
Flossenbürg concentration camp survivors